Playa Limbo is a Mexican pop band with influences from jazz. They are originally from Guadalajara, Jalisco, Mexico.

Biography 
Angel Baillo (bass) and Jorge Corrales (keyboards) formed the group after playing together in a local rock band. They began as a project called Vodkatronik, experimenting with a mix of eighties music and electronic beats. They later met María León (Sargento Leon), who joined as lead vocals and guitar. They have performed in various parts of Mexico, including Querétaro, Nayarit, Leon, and Aguascalientes.

Maria Leon (Sargento Leon) left the group in 2016 to co-star US Spanish Television Series produced by Telemundo called Guerra de ídolos. Her replacement as lead singer is Jass Reyes.

Discography

Canciones de hotel (2008)
Año perfecto (2010)
El tren de la vida (2012)
De días y de noches (2014)
Universo Amor (2020)
Luces de Sal (2021)

Songs 
"Así Fue" (2010)
"Qué bello" (2012)
"A dónde va nuestro amor" - main theme of Muchacha italiana viene a casarse (2014)
"Sola" (2016)
"Mi Perdición" (2017)

Awards and nominations

References

External links 

Mexican pop music groups
Musical groups from Guadalajara, Jalisco
Latin pop music groups